Mousseline may refer to:

 Mousseline sauce or Hollandaise sauce
 Mousseline, a type of forcemeat
 Mousseline, a type of fabric
 Mousseline, the French name for Rosie, the younger sister of Caillou.